Johnbell is an extinct genus of ungulates, from the family Interatheriidae. The only known species belonging to the genus is Johnbell hatcheri. This animal was named after the paleontologist John Bell Hatcher. This genus is related to Ignigena and the subfamily Interatheriinae. This animal lived in central Chile during the Early Oligocene.

References

Typotheres
Oligocene mammals of South America
Paleogene Chile
Fossils of Chile
Fossil taxa described in 2006
Prehistoric placental genera